(Sanskrit: "levels of virtue") are the fourteen stages of spiritual development and growth through which a soul gradually passes before it attains moksha (liberation). According to Jainism, it is a state of soul from a complete dependence on karma to the state of complete dissociation from it. Here the word virtue does not mean an ordinary moral quality, but it stands for the nature of soul — knowledge, belief and conduct.

Classification 

The fourteen Gunasthāna represents the soul's gradual manifestation of the innate qualities of knowledge, belief and conduct in a more and more perfect form. Following are the stages of spiritual development:

The Fourteen stages

1. Mithyadristi
The first stage signifies gross ignorance. If at this stage, a person meditates on his existence, there is a temporary suspension of the following:
The first three energies of darsanamohaniya karma (which obstructs right belief)
mithyātva
samyaga mithyātva
samyak prakriti
 The anantdnubandhi (intensest) type of anger, pride, deceit and greed

2. Sasādana

This gunasthāna represents the mental state of the soul in the process or act of falling from right faith. Here sā means "with" and sādana means "exhausted", hence that which is characterised by exhausted faith.

3. Misradrsti
Misra literally means mixed. At this stage, a person hovers between certainty and doubt on Right belief.

4 Avirata samyagdrishti
When doubts of an individual are removed, he/she reaches this stage and becomes a samyagdrishti (true believer). The doubts may have been removed by meditation or the instruction of a spiritual teacher.

5. Deśavirata
Deśa means partial and virata means vow i.e. observance of the partial vows in pursuit of Right conduct.

6. Pramatta virata (slightly imperfect vows)
First step of life as a Jain muni (monk). The stage of complete self-discipline, although sometimes brought into wavering through negligence.

7. Apramatta virata (perfect observance of vows)

8. Apurva Karana
The stage of one in whom the passions are still occurring in a gross form.

9. Annivrtti Karaņa (advanced thought activity)
The stage of one who practices the process called annivrtti karaņa  and in whom however the passions are still occurring.

10. Sukshma sāmprāya
The stage of one in whom the passions occur in a subtle form.

11. Upaśānta-kasaya
The stage of one who has suppressed every passion but still does not possess omniscience.

12. Kshina Moha (Destruction of delusion)
The stage of who has annihilated every passion but does not yet possess omniscience. According to the Jain text, Gommatsāra Jīvakanda:

13. Sayoga Kevali
Sa means "with" and yoga refers to the three channels of activity, i.e., mind, speech and body. Kevali is a term used to refer the omniscient beings (arihantas). This stage is characterised by the destruction of all inimical (ghātiā) karmas and attainment of omniscience. 

14. Ayoga Kevali
This is the last stage on the Path, and is followed by the soul's destruction of the aghātiā karmas. Those who pass this stage are called siddha and become fully established in Right Faith, Right Knowledge and Right Conduct.

The destruction of causes of bondage
The whole scheme of gunasthana in Jain philosophy is devised in a logical order according to the principle of decreasing sinfulness and increasing purity. At the first stage, all the five causes of bondage — Irrational beliefs (mithyatva), non-restraint (avirati), carelessness (pramada), passions (kashaya) and activities of mind, speech and body (yoga) — are in full operation. Irrational beliefs (mithyatva) are partially suppressed in the second and third stages, and are fully eliminated in the fourth stage. In stages five and six, non-restraint (avirati) is gradually eliminated in stages. From the seventh stage onwards, carelessness is removed and only passions and activity exercise their influence. From the eleventh to the thirteenth all the passions are eliminated and only activity is present. On the last stage, there is no activity, hence no binding of karma.

The destruction of karmas
Out of the four ghatiya karmas, darsana mohiniya karma (perception deluding karma) is destroyed first in the fourth stage of gunasthana. Caritra mohiniya karma (conduct deluding karma) is destroyed next in the twelfth gunasthana. The remaining three ghatiya karmas (knowledge obstructing karma, perception obstructing karma and energy obstructing karma) are destroyed in the 13th stage and the rest four aghatiya karmas (life-span determining, body determining, status determining and feeling producing karmas) are destroyed in the 14th or the last stage of gunasthana.

See also
Types of Karma
Causes of Karma

References

Citations

Sources
 Alt URL
 
 
 
 
 

Jain philosophical concepts